Green Lawn Cemetery is a cemetery located in China Grove, North Carolina. Graves marked as early as 1798 have been found in Green Lawn Cemetery.

One person of note interred at Green Lawn Cemetery is Dixie Upright.

References

Cemeteries in North Carolina
Buildings and structures in Rowan County, North Carolina